The Journal of Reformed Theology (JRT) is a quarterly peer-reviewed academic journal published by Brill on behalf of the International Reformed Theological Institute.

External links
 

Brill Publishers academic journals
Publications established in 2007
Protestant studies journals
Quarterly journals